Miguel Emilio Almonte (born April 4, 1993) is a Dominican former professional baseball pitcher. He has played in Major League Baseball (MLB) for the Kansas City Royals and Los Angeles Angels.

Career

Kansas City Royals
On November 20, 2010, Almonte signed with the Kansas City Royals organization as an international free agent. He made his professional debut with the Dominican Summer League Royals in 2011, posting a 5.40 ERA in 5 games. The following year, Almonte split the season between the DSL Royals and the AZL Royals, posting a cumulative 8-2 record and 1.75 ERA in 16 appearances. In 2013, he pitched for the World Team at the 2013 All-Star Futures Game. He finished the 2013 season with a 3.10 earned run average and 132 strikeouts in  innings for the Single-A Lexington Legends. Although the Royals considered starting him in Double A, he started the 2014 season with the High-A Wilmington Blue Rocks. In 23 games with Wilmington, Almonte recorded a 6-8 record and 4.49 ERA with 101 strikeouts in 110.1 innings of work. Almonte began the 2015 season with the Double-A Northwest Arkansas Naturals before being promoted to the Triple-A Omaha Storm Chasers, logging a cumulative 6-6 record and 4.51 ERA.

On September 1, 2015, Almonte was selected to the 40-man roster and promoted to the major leagues for the first time. He made his MLB debut that day, allowing 2 earned runs in an inning of work against the Detroit Tigers. He finished his rookie season with a 6.23 ERA in 9 big league appearances. He spent the 2016 season in the minor leagues, recording a 5-8 record and 5.92 ERA in 32 games between Omaha and Northwest Arkansas. Almonte spent the majority of the 2017 in Double-A and Triple-A, and allowed 3 earned runs in 2.0 innings of work across 2 games for the Royals. Almonte was designated for assignment by Kansas City on April 2, 2018.

Los Angeles Angels
On April 4, 2018, Almonte was traded to the Los Angeles Angels in exchange for cash considerations. In 8 relief appearances with the Angles, he was 0-0 with a 10.29 ERA and 7 strikeouts in 7 innings. Almonte also struggled in 25 appearances for the Triple-A Salt Lake Bees, registering a 10.18 ERA. On January 20, 2019, Almonte was designated for assignment and outrighted on January 26. Almonte did not appear in a game for the Angels organization in 2019 and elected free agency on November 4, 2019.

References

External links

1993 births
Living people
Arizona League Angels players
Arizona League Royals players
Dominican Republic expatriate baseball players in the United States
Dominican Summer League Royals players
Gigantes del Cibao players
Kansas City Royals players
Lexington Legends players
Los Angeles Angels players
Major League Baseball pitchers
Major League Baseball players from the Dominican Republic
Northwest Arkansas Naturals players
Omaha Storm Chasers players
Peoria Javelinas players
Salt Lake Bees players
Wilmington Blue Rocks players